Crucoli is a comune and town   in the province of Crotone, in Calabria, southern Italy.

Economy
Crucoli relies on the production of oil, wine, cereals, citruses, and cattle animal husbandry.

References

Crucoli